Eddie Avoth (born 2 May 1945) is a former boxer and actor. He was British and Commonwealth Light Heavyweight Boxing Champion, with a record of 44 wins (20 by knockout) from 53 fights.

History
Avoth was born in Cardiff, Wales. He was a product of the Eddie Thomas boxing gym based in Merthyr Tydfil, which spawned the boxing careers of such notables as Howard Winstone and Ken Buchanan . Avoth's professional boxing career spanned nine years and in this time he won the British and Commonwealth titles. Avoth retired from the ring in 1972. He was also an accomplished amateur boxer and represented his country internationally on many occasions.

Following retirement from boxing, Avoth settled in Puerto Banús, Costa del Sol, Spain where he part-owned a well-known celebrity restaurant. He now resides back in the UK.

Avoth's acting career began with a starring role for entertainment giant Warner Brothers in their 1986 blockbuster film "Instant Justice" where he starred alongside Michael Paré, Tawny Kitaen and Charles Napier. The film was directed by Hollywood producer Craig T Rumar. In 2010 he appeared in the Howard Winstone biopic Risen as boxing promoter Jack Solomons. Avoth himself was played in the film by Welsh boxer Enzo Maccarinelli.

Avoth now regularly travels around the UK and Ireland making after dinner speeches.

Professional boxing record

|-
|align="center" colspan=8|44 Wins (20 knockouts, 24 decisions), 9 Losses (4 knockouts, 5 decisions) 
|-
| align="center" style="border-style: none none solid solid; background: #e3e3e3"|Result
| align="center" style="border-style: none none solid solid; background: #e3e3e3"|Record
| align="center" style="border-style: none none solid solid; background: #e3e3e3"|Opponent
| align="center" style="border-style: none none solid solid; background: #e3e3e3"|Type
| align="center" style="border-style: none none solid solid; background: #e3e3e3"|Round
| align="center" style="border-style: none none solid solid; background: #e3e3e3"|Date
| align="center" style="border-style: none none solid solid; background: #e3e3e3"|Location
| align="center" style="border-style: none none solid solid; background: #e3e3e3"|Notes
|-align=center
|Loss
|
|align=left| Bunny Johnson
|TKO
|3
|15 March 1972
|align=left| Double Diamond Club, Caerphilly, United Kingdom
|align=left|
|-
|Loss
|
|align=left| Sarel Aucamp
|PTS
|10
|30 October 1971
|align=left| Ellis Park Stadium, Johannesburg, South Africa
|align=left|
|-
|Win
|
|align=left| Kosie Smith
|PTS
|10
|12 June 1971
|align=left| Ellis Park Stadium, Johannesburg, South Africa
|align=left|
|-
|Win
|
|align=left| Guinea Roger
|PTS
|8
|12 May 1971
|align=left| Double Diamond Club, Caerphilly, United Kingdom
|align=left|
|-
|Loss
|
|align=left| Chris Finnegan
|TKO
|15
|24 January 1971
|align=left| Grosvenor House, Mayfair, London, United Kingdom
|align=left|
|-
|Win
|
|align=left| Trevor Thornberry
|TKO
|6
|23 October 1970
|align=left| Brisbane Festival Hall, Brisbane, Australia
|align=left|
|-
|Loss
|
|align=left| Mike Quarry
|UD
|10
|6 June 1970
|align=left| Valley Music Theater, Woodland Hills, Los Angeles, United States
|align=left|
|-
|Win
|
|align=left| John "Young" McCormack
|DQ
|8
|6 April 1970
|align=left| Nottingham Ice Stadium, Nottingham, United Kingdom
|align=left|
|-
|Win
|
|align=left| Emilio Okee
|PTS
|10
|16 February 1970
|align=left| National Sporting Club, Piccadilly, London, United Kingdom
|align=left|
|-
|Win
|
|align=left| Bunny Johnson
|PTS
|8
|27 October 1969
|align=left| Commodore Hotel, Nottingham, United Kingdom
|align=left|
|-
|Loss
|
|align=left| Ivan Prebeg
|PTS
|15
|28 June 1969
|align=left| Salata Stadium, Zagreb, Croatia
|align=left|
|-
|Win
|
|align=left| Lloyd Walford
|PTS
|8
|17 March 1969
|align=left| National Sporting Club, Piccadilly, London, United Kingdom
|align=left|
|-
|Win
|
|align=left| "Boxing" Luis Gutierrez
|KO
|4
|6 February 1969
|align=left| Liverpool Stadium, Liverpool, United Kingdom
|align=left|
|-
|Win
|
|align=left| John "Young" McCormack
|TKO
|11
|13 January 1969
|align=left| Anglo-American Sporting Club, Mayfair, London, United Kingdom
|align=left|
|-
|Win
|
|align=left| Curtis Bruce
|TKO
|6
|18 November 1968
|align=left| Grosvenor House, Mayfair, London, United Kingdom
|align=left|
|-
|Win
|
|align=left| Stanford Bulla
|PTS
|10
|24 July 1968
|align=left| Coney Beach Arena, Porthcawl, United Kingdom
|align=left|
|-
|Win
|
|align=left| Johnny Hendrickson
|PTS
|8
|24 April 1968
|align=left| Sophia Gardens, Cardiff, United Kingdom
|align=left|
|-
|Win
|
|align=left| Johnny Hendrickson
|PTS
|8
|8 March 1968
|align=left| National Sporting Club, Piccadilly, London, United Kingdom
|align=left|
|-
|Win
|
|align=left| Guinea Roger
|PTS
|10
|28 November 1967
|align=left| Afan Lido, Aberavon, United Kingdom
|align=left|
|-
|Win
|
|align=left| Johnny Hendrickson
|TKO
|3
|19 September 1967
|align=left| Empire Pool, Wembley, London, United Kingdom
|align=left|
|-
|Loss
|
|align=left| John "Young" McCormack
|TKO
|7
|19 June 1967
|align=left| National Sporting Club, Piccadilly, London, United Kingdom
|align=left|
|-
|Loss
|
|align=left| Ernie Field
|TKO
|2
|30 January 1967
|align=left| Midland Hotel, Manchester, United Kingdom
|align=left|
|-
|Win
|
|align=left| Johnny Halafihi
|PTS
|8
|7 December 1966
|align=left| Afan Lido, Port Talbot, United Kingdom
|align=left|
|-
|Win
|
|align=left| Johnny Ould
|TKO
|4
|26 October 1966
|align=left| National Sporting Club, Piccadilly, London, United Kingdom
|align=left|
|-
|Win
|
|align=left| Ernie Field
|PTS
|8
|19 September 1966
|align=left| Midland Hotel, Manchester, United Kingdom
|align=left|
|-
|Loss
|
|align=left| Derek Richards
|PTS
|10
|12 July 1966
|align=left| Afan Lido, Port Talbot, United Kingdom
|align=left|
|-
|Win
|
|align=left| Clarence Prince
|TKO
|2
|6 June 1966
|align=left| National Sporting Club, Piccadilly, London, United Kingdom
|align=left|
|-
|Win
|
|align=left| "Stunning" Steve Richards
|TKO
|4
|11 May 1966
|align=left| Midland Hotel, Manchester, United Kingdom
|align=left|
|-
|Win
|
|align=left| Lloyd Walford
|TKO
|7
|19 April 1966
|align=left| National Sporting Club, Piccadilly, London, United Kingdom
|align=left|
|-
|Win
|
|align=left| Charlie "The War" Wilson
|TKO
|1
|4 April 1966
|align=left| National Sporting Club, Piccadilly, London, United Kingdom
|align=left|
|-
|Win
|
|align=left| Charlie "The War" Wilson
|PTS
|8
|28 February 1966
|align=left| National Sporting Club, Piccadilly, London, United Kingdom
|align=left|
|-
|Win
|
|align=left| Lloyd Walford
|TKO
|6
|10 January 1966
|align=left| National Sporting Club, Piccadilly, London, United Kingdom
|align=left|
|-
|Win
|
|align=left| Joe "Dinner" Bell
|PTS
|8
|26 April 1965
|align=left| National Sporting Club, Piccadilly, London, United Kingdom
|align=left|
|-
|Win
|
|align=left| Fitzroy Lindo
|TKO
|7
|8 March 1965
|align=left| National Sporting Club, Piccadilly, London, United Kingdom
|align=left|
|-
|Win
|
|align=left| Syd Brown
|TKO
|5
|1 February 1965
|align=left| National Sporting Club, Piccadilly, London, United Kingdom
|align=left|
|-
|Win
|
|align=left| "Rob" Roy Thomas
|TKO
|6
|20 January 1965
|align=left| Sophia Gardens, Cardiff, United Kingdom
|align=left|
|-
|Win
|
|align=left| Tony French
|PTS
|6
|14 December 1964
|align=left| National Sporting Club, Piccadilly, London, United Kingdom
|align=left|
|-
|Win
|
|align=left| George Palin
|KO
|1
|1 December 1964
|align=left| Empire Pool, Wembley, London, United Kingdom
|align=left|
|-
|Win
|
|align=left| Louis Onwuna
|KO
|2
|16 November 1964
|align=left| Midland Hotel, Manchester, United Kingdom
|align=left|
|-
|Win
|
|align=left| Fitzroy Lindo
|PTS
|8
|2 November 1964
|align=left| Ebbw Vale Indoor Cricket Hall, Ebbw Vale, United Kingdom
|align=left|
|-
|Win
|
|align=left| Gary Chippendale
|TKO
|4
|12 October 1964
|align=left| Free Trade Hall, Manchester, United Kingdom
|align=left|
|-
|Win
|
|align=left| Jimmy "Vertigo" Stewart
|KO
|1
|21 September 1964
|align=left| Midland Hotel, Manchester, United Kingdom
|align=left|
|-
|Win
|
|align=left| Louis Onwuna
|PTS
|6
|20 July 1964
|align=left| Ebbw Vale Indoor Cricket Hall, Ebbw Vale, United Kingdom
|align=left|
|-
|Win
|
|align=left| Syd Brown
|PTS
|8
|22 June 1964
|align=left| National Sporting Club, Piccadilly, London, United Kingdom
|align=left|
|-
|Win
|
|align=left| Dave "Tom" Arnold
|KO
|4
|20 May 1964
|align=left| National Sporting Club, Piccadilly, London, United Kingdom
|align=left|
|-
|Win
|
|align=left| "Union" Jack Powell
|PTS
|6
|12 May 1964
|align=left| Empire Pool, Wembley, London, United Kingdom
|align=left|
|-
|Win
|
|align=left| Henry Turkington
|TKO
|4
|24 March 1964
|align=left| Empire Pool, Wembley, London, United Kingdom
|align=left|
|-
|Win
|
|align=left| Syd Brown
|PTS
|8
|24 February 1964
|align=left| National Sporting Club, Piccadilly, London, United Kingdom
|align=left|
|-
|Loss
|
|align=left| "Average" Joe Somerville
|PTS
|6
|9 December 1963
|align=left| National Sporting Club, Piccadilly, London, United Kingdom
|align=left|
|-
|Win
|
|align=left| "Average" Joe Somerville
|PTS
|6
|25 November 1963
|align=left| National Sporting Club, Piccadilly, London, United Kingdom
|align=left|
|-
|Win
|
|align=left| Ray Fallone
|PTS
|6
|22 October 1963
|align=left| National Sporting Club, Piccadilly, London, United Kingdom
|align=left|
|-
|Win
|
|align=left| Terry Phillips "66"
|PTS
|6
|20 August 1963
|align=left| Coney Beach Arena, Porthcawl, United Kingdom
|align=left|
|-
|Win
|
|align=left| Dave "Tom" Arnold
|PTS
|6
|1 July 1963
|align=left| National Sporting Club, Piccadilly, London, United Kingdom
|align=left|
|}

See also
 List of British light-heavyweight boxing champions

External links
 
  Risen -the film

1945 births
Living people
Boxers from Cardiff
Light-heavyweight boxers
Welsh male boxers
Welsh male film actors